Cnemaspis mumpuniae is a species of gecko from Pulau Natuna Besar, Indonesia.

References

Further reading
Amarasinghe, AA Thasun, et al. "A New Species of Cnemaspis (Reptilia: Gekkonidae) from Sumatra, Indonesia." Herpetologica 71.2 (2015): 160–167.
Riyanto, Awal, L. Grismer, and Perry L. Wood Jr. "Cyrtodactylus rosichonariefi sp. nov.(Squamata: Gekkonidae), a new swamp-dwelling bent-toed gecko from Bunguran Island (Great Natuna), Indonesia." Zootaxa 3964.1 (2015): 114–124.

Cnemaspis
Reptiles described in 2014